Nils Häggström (4 October 1885 – 15 March 1974) was a Swedish modern pentathlete. He competed at the 1912 Summer Olympics.

References

External links

1885 births
1974 deaths
Swedish male modern pentathletes
Olympic modern pentathletes of Sweden
Modern pentathletes at the 1912 Summer Olympics
Sportspeople from Stockholm
20th-century Swedish people